The Adventures of Tintin (also known as The Adventures of Tintin: The Secret of the Unicorn) is a 2011 computer-animated action-adventure film based on Hergé's comic book series of the same name. It was directed by Steven Spielberg, produced by Spielberg, Peter Jackson and Kathleen Kennedy, and written by Steven Moffat, Edgar Wright, and Joe Cornish. The film stars Jamie Bell as Tintin, alongside Andy Serkis, and Daniel Craig. In the film, Tintin, Snowy, and Captain Haddock (Serkis) search for the treasure of the Unicorn, a ship once captained by Haddock's ancestor Sir Francis Haddock, but face dangerous pursuit by Ivan Ivanovitch Sakharine (Craig), the descendant of Sir Haddock's nemesis, Red Rackham.

Spielberg and Hergé admired each other's work; the director acquired the film rights to The Adventures of Tintin after the author's death in 1983, and re-optioned them in 2002. Filming was due to begin in October 2008 for a 2010 release, but the release was delayed to 2011 after Universal Pictures backed out of producing the film with Paramount Pictures, which had provided $30 million in pre-production; Columbia Pictures replaced Universal as co-financer. The delay resulted in Thomas Brodie-Sangster, who was originally cast as Tintin, departing and being replaced by Bell. The film draws inspiration from the Tintin volumes The Crab with the Golden Claws (1941), The Secret of the Unicorn (1943), and Red Rackham's Treasure (1944). Principal photography began in January 2009 and finished that July, with a combination of voice acting, motion capture, and traditional computer-animation being used.

The Adventures of Tintin premiered in Brussels, Hergé's home region, on 22 October 2011, and was theatrically released in Europe by Sony Pictures Releasing International on 26 October and in the United States by Paramount Pictures on 21 December, in Digital 3D and IMAX 3D formats. The film received positive reviews from critics, who praised the stylized motion capture animation (particularly the faithful character designs to Hergé's works), visual effects, action sequences, cast performances, and musical score, with the film positively compared to Spielberg's Raiders of the Lost Ark (1981). The Adventures of Tintin was also a commercial success, grossing over $374 million, and received numerous awards and nominations, including being the first motion-captured animated film (and first non-Pixar film) to win the Golden Globe Award for Best Animated Feature Film, while John Williams was nominated for an Academy Award for Best Original Score. A sequel directed by Jackson has been announced, but has since stalled in development hell.

Plot

In 1940s Brussels, while browsing in an outdoor market with his pet dog Snowy, young journalist Tintin purchases a miniature model of a ship known as the Unicorn, but is accosted by an Interpol officer named Barnaby and a ship collector named Ivan Ivanovitch Sakharine, who both unsuccessfully attempt to get the model from Tintin. After Tintin takes the model home to his apartment, it gets accidentally broken during a chase between Snowy and a cat. A parchment scroll then slips out and rolls under a piece of furniture. Meanwhile, bumbling police detectives Thomson and Thompson are on the trail of a pickpocket named Aristides Silk.

After visiting Maritime Library to uncover the history surrounding the Unicorn, Tintin returns to find the Unicorn has been stolen, suspecting Sakharine. He heads to Marlinspike Hall and accuses him of the theft, but noticing Sakharine's model is not broken he realizes there are two Unicorn models. Tintin then returns home to his apartment to find it ransacked. Snowy shows him the scroll, but they are interrupted by the arrival of Barnaby, who is then assassinated while attempting to recover the Unicorn. Tintin places the scroll in his wallet, but is pickpocketed by Silk the next morning.

Later, Tintin is abducted and imprisoned by accomplices of Sakharine on the SS Karaboudjan. He learns that Sakharine formed an alliance with the ship's staff and led a mutiny to take control. On board, Tintin meets Archibald Haddock, the ship's captain who is permanently drunk and unaware of most of his past. Tintin, Haddock and Snowy eventually outrun the crew and escape from the Karaboudjan in a lifeboat. The ship fails to ram their boat because they instead rammed an empty lifeboat the captain accidentally released during his escape. Presuming them to have survived by the number of lifeboats, Sakharine sends a seaplane to find and capture them. Feeling cold and thirsty on the lifeboat ride, Haddock foolishly uses a stowaway bottle of scotch whisky to light a fire in the boat, accidentally causing a massive explosion that flips the boat upside down and leaves the trio stranded on top of it. The trio seizes the plane, and uses it to fly towards the fictitious Moroccan port of Bagghar. However, the seaplane crashes in a desert due to low fuel and a thunderstorm.

While trekking through the desert, Haddock hallucinates and remembers his ancestor, Sir Francis Haddock, the 17th-century captain of the Unicorn whose treasure-laden ship was attacked by the crew of a pirate ship, led by Red Rackham, later revealed to be Sakharine's ancestor. Sir Francis surrendered and eventually sank the Unicorn and most of the treasure, to prevent it from falling into Rackham's hands. The story implies there were three Unicorn models, each containing a scroll; together, the scrolls can reveal coordinates of the location of the sunken Unicorn and its treasure.

The third model is in Bagghar, possessed by Omar ben Salaad. Sakharine causes a distraction in a Bianca Castafiore concert that results in him stealing the third scroll. A chase through the city ensues during which he gains all the scrolls. Just as he is ready to give up, Tintin is persuaded by Haddock to continue. With help from Thomson and Thompson, Tintin and Haddock track Sakharine back to Brussels and set up a trap, but Sakharine uses his pistol to resist arrest. When his men fail to save him, Sakharine challenges Haddock to a sword fight with the cranes at the dock. After the fight, Sakharine is pushed overboard by Haddock and then finally rescued and arrested by Thomson and Thompson.

Tintin, Haddock and Snowy are guided by the three scrolls back to Marlinspike Hall. Haddock notes a globe with an island he knows doesn't exist and presses it, causing the globe to open and reveal some of the treasure that Sir Francis had managed to recover along with his hat and a clue to the Unicorns location. The film ends with both men agreeing on setting up an expedition to find the shipwreck and the rest of the treasure.

Voice cast 
 Jamie Bell as Tintin. Bell replaced Thomas Brodie-Sangster, who dropped out when filming was delayed in October 2008. Jackson suggested Bell to take on the role after previously casting him as Jimmy in his King Kong remake.
 Andy Serkis as Captain Archibald Haddock and Sir Francis Haddock. Spielberg suggested Serkis, given he played Gollum in Jackson's The Lord of the Rings trilogy and King Kong in the 2005 remake, which were both roles requiring motion capture, and also because he considers Serkis a "great and funny actor". Serkis joked he was concerned Jackson wanted him to play Tintin's dog, Snowy, who was animated traditionally, i.e., without motion capture. Serkis remarked upon reading the comics again for the role that they had a surreal Pythonesque quality. The actor researched seamen, and gave Haddock a Scottish accent as he felt the character had "a rawness, an emotional availability, a more Celtic kind of feel".
 Daniel Craig as Ivan Ivanovitch Sakharine, the main antagonist and descendant of Red Rackham; and Red Rackham the pirate who attacked the Unicorn, the ship captained by Sir Francis Haddock. Spielberg described Sakharine as a "champagne villain, cruel when he has to be but with a certain elegance to him". Jackson and Spielberg decided to promote Sakharine from a relatively minor character to the villain, and while considering an "interesting actor" to portray him, Spielberg came up with Craig, with whom he had worked on Munich. Craig joked he followed "the English tradition of playing bad guys".
 Nick Frost and Simon Pegg as Thomson and Thompson respectively, bumbling police detectives who are almost identical despite not being related. The duo was invited out of necessity to have a comedy team that could act identical. Spielberg invited Pegg to the set and offered him the role after he had completed How to Lose Friends & Alienate People. Pegg had previously starred alongside Serkis in John Landis' Burke & Hare, in 2010.
 Toby Jones as Aristides Silk, a pickpocket and self-confessed kleptomaniac.
 Daniel Mays as Allan, Captain Haddock's former first mate.
 Mackenzie Crook as Tom, a thug on the Karaboudjan.
 Gad Elmaleh as Omar ben Salaad, an Arab potentate. Elmaleh stated his accent was "the childhood coming back".
 Enn Reitel as Nestor, Sakharine's butler; and Mr. Crabtree, a vendor who sells the Unicorn to Tintin.
 Tony Curran as Lieutenant Delcourt, an ally of Tintin.
 Joe Starr as Barnaby Dawes, an Interpol agent who tries to warn Tintin about purchasing the Unicorn and ends up being shot by Sakharine's thugs on Tintin's doorstep.
 Kim Stengel as Bianca Castafiore, a comical opera singer. While Castafiore was absent from the three stories, Jackson said she was added for her status as an "iconic character" and because she would be a fun element of the plot. Renée Fleming provides the singing voice for Castafiore.
 Sonje Fortag as Mrs. Finch, Tintin's landlady.
 Cary Elwes and Phillip Rhys as French seaplane pilots working for Sakharine. Elwes came across Spielberg in the cereal aisle of a grocery store shortly after Spielberg visited Robert Zemeckis on the A Christmas Carol set and persuaded Spielberg to cast him on the film due to being a huge Tintin fan. Spielberg appreciated Elwes' devotion to the franchise and cast him as one of the pilots because they were the last of the parts to be cast, which Elwes gratefully accepted regardless of its size because being part of the film meant so much for him.
 Ron Bottitta as Unicorn Lookout.
 Mark Ivanir as Afgar Outpost Soldier/Secretary.
 Sebastian Roché as Pedro/1st Mate.
 Nathan Meister as a market artist who bears a resemblance to Hergé.
 Sana Etoile as a Press Reporter.

Production

Development 
Spielberg became an avid fan of The Adventures of Tintin comic book series in 1981 after a review compared Raiders of the Lost Ark to Tintin. Meanwhile, the comics' creator, Hergé—who disliked the previous live-action film versions and the animated series—became a fan of Spielberg. Michael Farr, author of Tintin: The Complete Companion, recalled Hergé "thought Spielberg was the only person who could ever do Tintin justice". Hergé had been looking to use the medium of film to make Tintin more current, as he felt that the animated films Tintin and the Temple of the Sun and Tintin and the Lake of Sharks had failed to capture the essence of the books. Spielberg and his production partner Kathleen Kennedy of Amblin Entertainment were scheduled to meet with Hergé in 1983 while filming Indiana Jones and the Temple of Doom in London. Hergé died that week, but his widow Fanny Remi decided to give them the rights. A three-year-long option to film the comics was finalized in 1984, with Universal Pictures as distributor.

Spielberg commissioned E.T. the Extra-Terrestrial writer Melissa Mathison to script a film about Tintin battling ivory hunters in Africa. Spielberg saw Tintin as an "Indiana Jones for kids" and wanted Jack Nicholson to play Haddock. Unsatisfied with the script, Spielberg continued production on Indiana Jones and the Last Crusade; the rights returned to the Hergé Foundation. Claude Berri and Roman Polanski became interested in filming the property, while Warner Bros. negotiated for the rights, but they could not guarantee the "creative integrity" that the Foundation found in Spielberg. In 2001, Spielberg revealed his interest in depicting Tintin with computer animation. In November 2002, his studio DreamWorks reestablished the option to film the series. Spielberg originally said he would only produce the film. In 2004, French magazine Capital reported Spielberg was intending a trilogy based on The Secret of the Unicorn / Red Rackham's Treasure, The Seven Crystal Balls / Prisoners of the Sun and The Blue Lotus / Tintin in Tibet (which are separate stories, but both feature Chang Chong-Chen). By then, Spielberg had reverted to his idea of a live-action adaptation and called Peter Jackson to ask if Weta Digital would create a computer-generated Snowy.

Jackson, a longtime fan of the comics, had used motion capture in The Lord of the Rings and King Kong; he suggested that a live-action adaptation would not do justice to the comic books and that motion capture was instead the best way of representing Hergé's world of Tintin. A week of filming took place in November 2006 in Playa Vista, Los Angeles, California, on the stage where James Cameron shot Avatar. Andy Serkis had been cast, while Jackson stood in for Tintin. During the shoot, Cameron and Robert Zemeckis (director of The Polar Express, another motion-captured animated film) were present. The footage was transmitted to Weta Digital, who produced a twenty-minute test reel that demonstrated a photorealistic depiction of the characters. Spielberg said he would not mind filming it digitally because he saw it as an animated film, and reiterated his live-action work would always be filmed traditionally. Lead designer Chris Guise visited Brussels to see the inspiration for Hergé's sceneries.

An official announcement about the collaboration was made in May 2007, although both filmmakers had to wait to film it: Spielberg was preparing Indiana Jones and the Kingdom of the Crystal Skull while Jackson was planning The Lovely Bones. Spielberg had considered two books to become the main story, The Crab with the Golden Claws and The Secret of the Unicorn, with the main plot eventually following the latter and its immediate sequel, Red Rackham's Treasure. Jackson felt the former's story "wasn't really robust enough to sustain a feature film", but the filmmakers still included elements from the comic, such as the Karaboudjan and the first meeting of Tintin and Haddock. Spielberg invited Edgar Wright to write the script for the film, but Wright was busy and instead recommended other names, including Steven Moffat. In October 2007, Moffat joined as the screenwriter for two of the Tintin films. Moffat said he was "love bombed" by Spielberg into accepting the offer to write the films, with the director promising to shield him from studio interference with his writing. Moffat finished a draft, but was unable to finish another due to the 2007–2008 Writers Guild of America strike. He then became executive producer of Doctor Who, leading Spielberg and Jackson (the latter being a fan of the show) to allow him to leave and fulfill his duty to the series. Wright then returned and agreed to take over the script while Joe Cornish, a fan of Tintin with whom Wright was working at the time, also worked with him. After two drafts of the script, Wright left in order to begin filming Scott Pilgrim vs the World., with Cornish staying on to finish the script under the guidance of Spielberg and Jackson.

More filming took place in March 2008. However, in August that year (a month before principal photography would have begun), Universal turned down their option to co-produce the film due to the poor box office performances of other recent performance-captured animated films, such as Monster House (2006) and Beowulf (2007), as well as Spielberg and Jackson's request for a combined 30% of the gross. Paramount Pictures (DreamWorks' distributor) had hoped to partner with Universal on the project, having spent $30 million on pre-production. Spielberg gave a ten-minute presentation of footage, hoping they would approve filming to begin in October. Paramount, along with their subsidiary Nickelodeon Movies, offered to produce as long as the directors found a studio that was willing to co-produce the film: Spielberg and Jackson agreed and negotiated with Sony's Columbia Pictures to co-finance and distribute the first film internationally by the end of October. Sony only agreed to finance two films, though Jackson said a third film may still happen.

Filming and visual effects 
Principal photography began on 26 January 2009; the release date was pushed from 2010 to 2011. Spielberg finished his film—after 32 days of shooting—in March 2009. Jackson was present for the first week of filming and supervised the rest of the shoot via a bespoke videoconferencing program. Simon Pegg said Jackson's voice would "be coming over the Tannoy like God". During filming, various directors, including Guillermo del Toro, Stephen Daldry and David Fincher visited. Spielberg wanted to treat the film like live-action, moving his camera around. He revealed: "Every movie I made, up until Tintin, I always kept one eye closed when I've been framing a shot", because he wanted to see the movie in 2-D, the way viewers would. "On Tintin, I have both of my eyes open". Jackson took the hands-on approach to directing Weta Digital during post-production, which Spielberg supervised through video conferencing. Spielberg said "there will be no cell phones, no TV sets, no modern cars. Just timeless Europe". His frequent collaborator and cinematographer Janusz Kamiński served as lighting consultant for Weta, and Jackson said the film would look "film noirish, very atmospheric". Spielberg finished six weeks of additional motion-capture filming in mid-July 2009. Post production was finished in September 2011. From the very beginning to the very end, the film took a total of seven years in production.

To improve the quality of the indoor lighting nuances, Weta Digital and NVIDIA developed a piece of ray tracing software called PantaRay, which requires 100 to 1,000 times more computation than traditional shadow-map based solutions. For the performance of "Snowy", various models served as a reference for actors on-set, manipulated by property master Brad Elliott. According to animators, Snowy was the hardest character to animate and develop, due to the type of coat he has as well as being white. Later, a dog's motion was captured digitally so the animators had inspiration for realistic movements. His vocal effects were taken from various breeds of dogs.

Music 

John Williams composed the musical score for The Adventures of Tintin. It was the first time Williams had composed the score of a film since 2008's Indiana Jones and the Kingdom of the Crystal Skull, as well as his first score for an animated film. Most of the score was written while the animation was still in the early stages, with Williams seeking to employ "the old Disney technique of doing music first and have the animators trying to follow what the music is doing". Eventually, several cues had to be revised during the editing of the film. The composer decided to employ various musical styles, with "1920s, 1930s European jazz" for the opening credits and "pirate music" for the battle at sea. The score was released on 21 October 2011 by Sony Classical Records.

Differences from the source material 
The film mainly draws its story from The Secret of the Unicorn (1943) and The Crab with the Golden Claws (1941) and to a much lesser degree, from Red Rackham's Treasure (1944). There are major differences from the source material, most notably with regard to the antagonists. In the book, Ivan Sakharine is a minor character, neither a villain nor the descendant of Red Rackham. As Sakharine was made the main antagonist in the film, the book's main villains, the Bird brothers, are absent from the adaptation, save for a small "cameo" in the initial sequence at the market. As a result of this change, many events transpire that bear no relation to events in the books involving Sakharine's character. As in other adaptations, Snowy's "voice" is not used.

Release 

The film's first press-screening was held in Belgium on 10 October 2011. The world première was held in Brussels, Belgium on 22 October 2011—attended by Princess Astrid and her younger daughters, Princess Luisa Maria and Princess Laetitia Maria, with the Paris première later the same day. Sony later released the film during late October and early November 2011 in Europe, Latin America and India. The film was released in Quebec on 9 December. Paramount distributed the film in Asia, New Zealand, United Kingdom, and all other English-speaking territories. They released the film in the United States on 21 December.

Home media 
On 13 March 2012, Paramount Home Entertainment released The Adventures of Tintin on DVD and Blu-ray. Both formats of the film were also released in a Blu-ray + DVD + Digital Copy combo pack and a Blu-ray 3D + Blu-ray + DVD + Digital Copy combo pack, with each pack including 11 behind-the-scenes featurettes.

During its first week available on home video, The Adventures of Tintin Blu-ray was the number-one-selling HD movie after selling 504,000 units and generating $11.09 million in sales. The film was also the second-highest-selling home media seller during its first week, with 50% of its profits coming from its Blu-ray market.

Reception

Critical response 

  Audiences polled by CinemaScore gave the film an average grade of "A−" on an A+ to F scale.

Colin Covert of the Star Tribune gave the film four stars out of four and said that Spielberg's first venture into animation was his most delightful dose of pure entertainment since Raiders of the Lost Ark. Amy Biancolli of the San Francisco Chronicle wrote: "Such are the timeless joys of the books (and now the movie), this sparkling absurdity and knack for buckling swash under the worst of circumstances. The boy may have the world's strangest cowlick, but he sure can roll with the punches". Roger Ebert of Chicago Sun-Times gave the film three and a half stars out of four, calling it "an ambitious and lively caper, miles smarter than your average 3-D family film". He praised the setting of the film, stating its similarity to the original Tintin comic strips and was also pleased with the 3-D technology used in the film, saying that "Spielberg employed it as an enhancement to 2-D instead of an attention-grabbing gimmick".
Peter Travers of Rolling Stone also gave the film three and a half stars out of four and wrote: "The movie comes at you in a whoosh, like a volcano of creative ideas in full eruption. Presented as the first part of a trilogy produced by Spielberg and Peter Jackson, The Adventures of Tintin hits home for the kid in all of us who wants to bust out and run free". Kenneth Turan of Los Angeles Times said: "Think of The Adventures of Tintin as a song of innocence and experience, able to combine a sweet sense of childlike wonder and pureness of heart with the most worldly and sophisticated of modern technology. More than anything, it's just a whole lot of fun".

Giving the film 3.5 out of 4 stars, Lou Lumenick of New York Post wrote: "Spielberg and an army of collaborators - deploying motion capture and 3-D more skillfully than in any film since Avatar - turn this unlikely material into one of the year's most pleasurable, family-friendly experiences, a grand thrill ride of a treasure hunt". Richard Corliss of Time wrote: "Motion capture, which transforms actors into cartoon characters in a vividly animated landscape, is the technique Spielberg has been waiting for—the Christmas gift … that he's dreamed of since his movie childhood". Jordan Mintzer of The Hollywood Reporter was also very positive about the film, describing it as "a good ol' fashioned adventure flick that hearkens back to the filmmaker's action-packed, tongue-in-cheek swashbucklers of the 1980s. Steven Spielberg's The Adventures of Tintin: The Secret of the Unicorn is a visually dazzling adaptation". Comparing it with another film, Mintzer said Tintin has "an altogether more successful mocap experience than earlier efforts like The Polar Express".

Belgian newspaper Le Soirs film critics Daniel Couvreur and Nicolas Crousse called the film "a great popular adventure movie", stating "[the film's] enthusiasm and childhood spirit are unreservedly infectious". Le Figaro praised the film, considering it to be "crammed with action, humor and suspense". Leslie Felperin of Variety wrote: "Clearly rejuvenated by his collaboration with producer Peter Jackson, and blessed with a smart script and the best craftsmanship money can buy, Spielberg has fashioned a whiz-bang thrill ride that's largely faithful to the wholesome spirit of his source but still appealing to younger, Tintin-challenged auds".

La Libre Belgique was, however, a little less enthusiastic; its film critic Alain Lorfèvre called the film "a technical success, [with] a Tintin vivid as it should be [and] a somewhat excessive Haddock". The Guardians Xan Brooks gave the film two stars out of five, stating: "While the big set pieces are often exuberantly handled, the human details are sorely wanting. How curious that Hergé achieved more expression with his use of ink-spot eyes and humble line drawings than a bank of computers and an army of animators were able to achieve". Blog Critics writer Ross Miller said: "Author Hergé's wonderfully bold and diverse array of characters are a mixed bag when it comes to how they've been translated to the big-screen" and that while the mystery might be "perfectly serviceable for film ... the execution of it at times feels languid and stodgy, like it's stumbling along from one eye-catching setpiece to the next". However, he summed it up as "an enjoyable watch with some spectacular set-pieces, lavish visuals and some fine motion-capture performances".

Tom McCarthy, the author of a study of the Tintin books, described Hollywood's treatment in this film of its characters and stories as "truly execrable", stating that it ignores the books' key idea of inauthenticity. The themes of fakeness and phoniness and counterfeit that drive many of the original plots are replaced in the film with messages that feel "as though we have wandered into a seminar on monetisation through self-empowerment … It's like making a biopic of Nietzsche that depicts him as a born-again Christian, or of Gandhi as a trigger-happy Rambo blasting his way through the Raj".

Steve Rose from The Guardian wrote about one of the film's major criticisms: that The Adventures of Tintin, much like The Polar Express, crossed into the uncanny valley, thereby rendering Tintin "too human and not human at all". Manohla Dargis, one of the chief critics of The New York Times, called the movie "a marvel of gee-wizardry and a night's entertainment that can feel like a lifetime". The simplicity of the comic strip, she wrote, is a crucial part of the success of Tintin, who is "an avatar for armchair adventurers". Dargis noted that Tintin's appearance in the film "resembled Hergé's creation, yet was eerily different as if, like Pinocchio, his transformation into human form had been prematurely interrupted". Another major fault in the film, Dargis opines, is how it is overworked; she writes that there is "hardly a moment of downtime, a chance to catch your breath or contemplate the tension between the animated Expressionism and the photo-realist flourishes". Nevertheless, she singles out some of the "interludes of cinematic delight", approving of the visual imagination employed within the movie's numerous exciting scenes.

The film was named in New York magazine's David Edelstein's Top 10 List for 2011. It was also included in HitFix's top 10 films of 2011.

Box office 
The Adventures of Tintin grossed $77,591,831 in North America and $296,402,120 in other territories for a worldwide total of $373,993,951.

In the United States, it is one of only 12 feature films to be released in over 3,000 theaters and still improve on its box office performance in its second weekend, increasing 17.6% from $9,720,993 to $11,436,160. On its first day, the film opened in the UK, France and Belgium, earning $8.6 million. In Belgium, Tintin's country of origin, the film made $520,000, while France provided $4.6 million, a number higher than other similar Wednesday debuts. In France, it was the second-best debut of the year for its first day after Harry Potter and the Deathly Hallows – Part 2. On its first weekend it topped the overseas box office with $56.2 million from 21 countries. In Belgium, it earned $1.99 million. It also earned the top spot in many major markets like France and the Maghreb region ($21 million), where it set a record opening weekend for an animated title; the UK, Ireland and Malta ($10.9 million), Germany ($4.71 million) and Spain ($3.75 million). It retained first place for a second consecutive and final weekend, earning $39.0 million from 45 territories. In its native Belgium it was up 20% to $2.39 million, while in France it plummeted 61% to $8.42 million. Its biggest debut was in Russia and the CIS ($4.81 million).

The film grossed  on its opening weekend (11–13 November 2011) in India, an all-time record for a Spielberg film and for an animated feature in India. The film was released with 351 prints, the largest-ever release for an animated film.

Accolades 
The Adventures of Tintin was nominated for Best Original Score at the 84th Academy Awards. It was the first all-digital motion-captured animated film (as well as the first non-Pixar film) to win a Golden Globe for Best Animated Feature Film. It also received two nominations at the 65th British Academy Film Awards in the categories of Best Animated Film and Best Special Visual Effects.

Video game 

A video game entitled The Adventures of Tintin: The Secret of the Unicorn, developed by game developer Ubisoft, was released to coincide with the release date of the film. Gameloft released a game for mobile devices to coincide with the film's European launch.

Possible sequels 
Originally, the second Tintin film was to be based on Hergé's The Seven Crystal Balls and Prisoners of the Sun. However, screenwriter Anthony Horowitz later stated that those books would be the second sequel and another story would become the first sequel.

Peter Jackson announced that he would direct the sequel once he had finished The Hobbit trilogy. Two years before The Secret of the Unicorn, Jackson mentioned that his favorite Tintin stories were The Seven Crystal Balls, Prisoners of the Sun, The Black Island, and The Calculus Affair, but he had not yet decided which stories would form the basis of the second film. He added "it would be great" to use Destination Moon and Explorers on the Moon for a third or fourth film in the series.

By the time The Secret of the Unicorn was released, Spielberg said the book that would form the sequel had been chosen and that the Thomson and Thompson detectives would "have a much bigger role". The sequel would be produced by Spielberg and directed by Jackson. Kathleen Kennedy said the script might be completed by February or March 2012 and motion-captured in summer 2012, so that the film would be on track to be released by Christmas 2014 or mid-2015.

In the months following the release of The Secret of the Unicorn, Spielberg revealed that a story outline for the sequel had been completed and that it was based on two books. Horowitz tweeted that Professor Calculus would be introduced in the sequel. During a press tour in Belgium for The Hobbit: An Unexpected Journey, Jackson said he intended to shoot performance-capture in 2013, aiming for a release date in 2015.

In March 2013, Spielberg said: "Don't hold me to it, but we're hoping the film will come out around Christmas-time in 2015. We know which books we're making, we can't share that now but we're combining two books which were always intended to be combined by Hergé". He refused to confirm the names of the books, but said The Blue Lotus would probably be the third Tintin film. In December 2014, when Jackson was asked if the Tintin sequel would be his next project after The Hobbit trilogy, he said that it would be made "at some point soon", but he added that he wanted to direct two New Zealand films before that.

In June 2015, Jamie Bell stated that the sequel was titled Tintin and the Temple of the Sun and that he hoped shooting would begin in early 2016 for a possible release by the end of 2017 or early 2018. Later in November, Horowitz said that he was no longer working on the sequel, and did not know if it was still being made, and in March 2016, he confirmed that the script he had written for the sequel had been scrapped.

In March 2016, Scout.co.nz announced that Jackson would produce the sequel rather than direct. The website also announced that a third Tintin film was in development, with Jackson serving as executive producer. Bell and Serkis were reported to be reprising their roles in both films. Spielberg later announced that Jackson was still attached to directing the sequel, and that it would enter work once Jackson completed another Amblin Partners/DreamWorks production.

In March 2018, Spielberg reiterated the above, saying that "Peter Jackson has to do the second part. Normally, if all goes well, he will soon start working on the script. As it takes two years of animation work on the film, for you, I would not expect to see it for about three years. But Peter will stick to it. Tintin is not dead!" In interviews later the same year, Jackson affirmed his intent to make another Tintin film, but said that a script was yet to be written. In an April 2022 interview with Forbes Magazine, Jamie Bell expressed interest in reprising his role saying. "He [Peter Jackson]’s always doing something, so if they said let’s get the band back together, we’d go do it. It’s going to be weird if I play Tintin at 45, but still, the technology allows it, so that’s fine."

See also 
 The Adventures of Tintin
 The Adventures of Tintin (TV series)
 Tintin and Golden Fleece (1961 film)
 Tintin and the Blue Oranges (1964 film)
 Tintin and the Temple of the Sun (1969 film)
 Tintin and the Lake of Sharks (1972 animated film)

References

External links 

  (archived)
 
 
 
 
 
 Guide to other screen adaptations of Tintin at Tintinologist.org

}}

2011 films
2011 computer-animated films
2011 3D films
2010s action adventure films
2010s children's animated films
2010s American animated films
American computer-animated films
American 3D films
American epic films
American action adventure films
American children's animated adventure films
Animated buddy films
Animated films based on comics
Films based on Belgian comics
Films based on multiple works of a series
Films set in the 1950s
Films set in Europe
Films set in Morocco
Films set in deserts
Films set on ships
IMAX films
Pirate films
Tintin films
Treasure hunt films
Films using motion capture
3D animated films
Rotoscoped films
New Zealand action films
New Zealand adventure films
New Zealand animated films
New Zealand children's films
New Zealand epic films
New Zealand 3D films
Annie Award winners
Best Animated Feature Film Golden Globe winners
Cultural depictions of cartoonists
Films directed by Steven Spielberg
Films produced by Steven Spielberg
Films produced by Kathleen Kennedy
Films with screenplays by Joe Cornish
Films with screenplays by Edgar Wright
Films with screenplays by Steven Moffat
Films scored by John Williams
Paramount Pictures films
Paramount Pictures animated films
Columbia Pictures films
Columbia Pictures animated films
Nickelodeon Movies films
Nickelodeon animated films
Amblin Entertainment films
Amblin Entertainment animated films
The Kennedy/Marshall Company films
WingNut Films films
2010s English-language films
Films produced by Peter Jackson